The large Asian roundleaf bat (Hipposideros lekaguli) is a species of bat in the family Hipposideridae. It is found in Malaysia, the Philippines, and Thailand.  The specific name commemorates Thai zoologist and conservationist Boonsong Lekagul.

Taxonomy and etymology
It was described as a new species in 1974 by Thonglongya and Hill. The holotype had been collected in the Kaeng Khoi District of Thailand in 1972 by Boonsong Lekagul. Lekagul is the eponym for the species name "lekaguli."

Description
Its ears are broad, large, and triangular. Its nose-leaf is complexly foliated with intermediate, anterior, and posterior leaflets.

Range and habitat
It was first documented in Thailand in 1972. In 1992, it was additionally documented in the Philippines. It is also found in Peninsular Malaysia.

Conservation
The large Asian roundleaf bat is listed as a near-threatened species by the IUCN as of 2019. It is experiencing widespread habitat loss.

References

External links
Images of this species

Hipposideros
Mammals described in 1974
Taxa named by John Edwards Hill
Bats of Southeast Asia
Taxonomy articles created by Polbot